Bob Russell (born 4 October 1945) is a former Australian rules footballer who played with Melbourne in the Victorian Football League (VFL).

Notes

External links 

1945 births
Living people
Australian rules footballers from Victoria (Australia)
Melbourne Football Club players
Mortlake Football Club players